Nexstar may refer to:

Nexstar Media Group, American telecommunications company headquartered in Irving, Texas
Nexstar, a telescope product line made by the company Celestron

See also
 Next Star (disambiguation)